Bohol Governor's Mansion, otherwise known as the People's Mansion, is the official residence of the Governor of Bohol in the Philippines. Since the 2013 Bohol earthquake, it now hosts to the office of the governor, as the century-old Capitol is undergoing repairs and earthquake-proofing.

History
Then Governor (later President) Carlos P. Garcia first conceived the idea of having an official residence under his governorship, who used the facility as his living quarters while in Tagbilaran. As the building was of prominence, it was used by high-ranking officials of the Japanese Imperial Army as their residence during their stay in the province. However, the residence fell into relative disuse after the war, since most governors preferred to commute back to their homes in the capital or hometowns.

However, it was during the administration of Gov. Lino Chatto that the Governor's Mansion gained prominence. He spearheaded the renovation program that added manicured lawns and fountains. After the EDSA People Power Revolution, it was renamed by Gov. David Tirol as the People's Mansion.

Mansion Office
Following the 2013 Bohol earthquake that damaged much of the infrastructures, including the Provincial Capitol with several cracks, the Governor's Office was moved to the residence with the name now reverted Governor's Mansion. Further, Gov. Edgar Chatto kept an office in the residence even after the restoration work at the Capitol. The office gained the name "Mansion Office of the Governor" to distinguish it to the Office of the Governor in the Capitol compound.

Facilities
Bohol Governor's Mansion includes living quarters for the Governor and his family, including his staff and a token police force to guard the facility. It includes a working office, reception hall and a conference room. Presidents of the Philippines also utilize the residence as their own when situated in the province, especially Benigno Aquino III in response to the Bohol earthquake. The mansion and surrounding facilities also house the auxiliary offices attached to the Office of the Governor.

References

Official residences in the Philippines
Local government buildings in the Philippines
Buildings and structures in Tagbilaran
Buildings and structures completed in 1931
20th-century architecture in the Philippines